AL, Al, Ål or al may stand for:

Arts and entertainment

Fictional characters

 Al (Aladdin) or Aladdin, the main character in Disney's Aladdin media
 Al (EastEnders), a minor character in the British soap opera
 Al (Fullmetal Alchemist) or Alphonse Elric, a character in the manga/anime
 Al Borland, a character in the Home Improvement universe
 Al Bundy, a character in the television series Married... with Children
 Al Calavicci, a character in the television series Quantum Leap
 Al McWhiggin, a supporting villain of Toy Story 2
 Al, or Aldebaran, a character in Re:Zero − Starting Life in Another World media

Music

 A L, an EP by French singer Amanda Lear
 American Life, an album by Madonna

Calendar 
 Anno Lucis, a dating system used in Freemasonry

Mythology and religion 
 Al (folklore), a spirit in Persian and Armenian mythology
 Al Basty, a tormenting female night demon in Turkish folklore
 Liber AL, the central sacred text of Thelema

Organisations

Government, military and political
 Arab League, a regional organisation of 22 Arab states
 Alternative List, a Swiss political party
 Armia Ludowa, the Soviet-backed Polish army in World War II, in contrast to the Western-backed Armia Krajowa (AK)
 Assembleia Legislativa (disambiguation)
 Awami League, a political party in Bangladesh
 , Indonesian for "Naval Force", common initialism associated with the Indonesian Navy

Sports bodies 
 American League, part of Major League Baseball
 Asia League Ice Hockey
 Airtricity League, the current official name of the League of Ireland

People and anthroponymy
 Al (given name), list of people named Al
 A. L., pseudonym of the British composer Amelia Lehmann
 Al-, Arabic prefix meaning "the" (definite article in Arabic), used in many family names
 Al (sometimes rendered as "Aal"), meaning "family of" (and distinct from the definite article ), used in some family names by important dynasties in Arabic; see Arabic names

Places

Americas 
 Alabama, a state of the United States (postal abbreviation: AL)
 Alagoas, a state of Brazil
 Allen County, Kansas, US (county code: AL)

Asia 
 Al, Iran
 Al, Yenişehir, Turkey

Europe 
 Albania
 Province of Alessandria, a province of Italy in the ISO 3166-2:IT code
 AL postcode area, St Albans, UK
 Ål, a municipality in Norway

Science and technology 
 -al, a suffix used in organic chemistry
 Aluminium, symbol Al, a chemical element
 Allylescaline, a psychedelic drug
 Artificial life
 .al, Internet top-level domain name for Albania
 AL register, the low byte of an X86 16-bit AX register
 AL, a measure of inductance in a magnetic core

Transport 
 AL (automobile), a French hybrid car in 1907
 AL, reporting mark of Almanor Railroad, California, US
 AL, IATA airline designator of:
 TransAVIAexport Airlines, Minsk, Belarus
 The now defunct Allegheny Airlines, Virginia, US
 The now defunct Skyway Airlines, Wisconsin, US

See also
 A1 (disambiguation)
 A/L or GCE Advanced Level
 Ai (disambiguation)